Ronald Benjamin Moppett  (born March 12, 1945) is a Canadian painter. He is known primarily for abstract paintings and for works in which he combines paint and collage, along with non-traditional materials. Moppett is based in Calgary, Alberta.

Biography 
Moppett was born in England on March 12, 1945, the eldest of four children, and immigrated to Calgary with his family in 1957. He has worked at different times as a curator, gallery director and teacher while pursuing a career as a painter.

Selected exhibitions
Moppett has been exhibiting since 1966. In 1982, a retrospective of his work was shown at the Walter Phillips Gallery at The Banff Centre. In 1988, he showed recent work with the 49th Parallel Centre for Contemporary Art, New York and in 1990, Katharine Ylitalo for the Glenbow Museum in Calgary organized Painting Nature with a Mirror; Ron Moppett, 1974-1989, a travelling exhibition.

In 2010, Moppett showed his work in two group exhibitions, Triumphant Carrot: The Persistence of Still Life, at the Contemporary Art Gallery, Vancouver, British Columbia, and Roadmap: Starting Points and Side Roads in Building a Collection, the Nickle Arts Museum, Calgary, Alberta. In 2015, his sculpture and installation work was exhibited in a large survey at the Nickle Arts Museum titled Ron Moppett: Sculptur(al). In 2016, the Art Gallery of Alberta exhibited Damian Moppett + Ron Moppett: (every story has two sides). In 2017, the National Gallery of Canada curated a two-person show of Moppett and his son Damian Moppett, in its Masterpiece in Focus series.

In 2020, curator Mark Lanctôt in an exhibition titled Painting Nature with a Mirror (he used the name of Moppett`s earlier show) at the Musée d'art contemporain de Montréal created a portrait of Canadian painting in the 1980s which included Moppett among its artists.
 
Moppett has also created a mural, THESAMEWAYBETTER/READER, made of more than 950,000 mosaic tiles for Calgary's East Village (2012). Commissioned by the Calgary Municipal Land Corporation, the mural is 110 feet long. It is the largest free-standing mosaic mural in Canada.

Awards 
 1986 Victor Martyn Lynch-Staunton Award;
 1997 Gershon Iskowitz Prize; 
 2005 Alberta Centennial Medal;
 2022 Honorary MFA recipient from AU;

Collections 
The Canada Council Art Bank Collection
Edmonton Art Gallery
Glenbow Museum, Calgary
MacKenzie Art Gallery, Regina
Musée d'art contemporain, Montreal
National Gallery of Canada, Ottawa
Nickle Galleries, University of Calgary
University of Lethbridge

References

Further reading 

Nasgaard, Roald. Abstract Painting in Canada. Vancouver: Douglas & McIntyre, 2008. 

1945 births
Living people
Artists from Calgary
People from Woking
Members of the Royal Canadian Academy of Arts
20th-century Canadian artists
21st-century Canadian artists
Canadian art curators
21st-century Canadian sculptors
21st-century Canadian painters
21st-century Canadian male artists
21st-century sculptors
Canadian contemporary artists
Canadian contemporary painters
Canadian male painters
Canadian male sculptors
Canadian multimedia artists
Canadian sculptors
Canadian muralists